Iorgu Constantin Albulescu (4 October 1934 – 8 April 2016), known professionally as Mircea Albulescu, was a Romanian actor, university professor, journalist, poet, writer, and member of the Writers' Union of Romania (Uniunea Scriitorilor). 

He was born as Iorgu Constantin V. Albulescu, in Bucharest, on 4 October 1934. He graduated from the Secondary School of Architecture in 1952, and in 1956 he graduated from the Institute of Theatrical and Cinematographic Art in Bucharest. He received a star on the Romanian Walk of Fame in Bucharest on 29 October 2011. 

Albulescu died on 8 April 2016 at Floreasca Hospital due to heart failure.

Filmography

Pasărea furtunii (1957)
Dacii (1967) 
Aventurile lui Tom Sawyer (1968)
Moarte lui Joe Indianul (1968)
Vin cicliștii (1968)
Sick Animals (1970)
Canarul și viscolul (1970)
Prea mic pentru un război atât de mare (1970) 
Sentința (1970)
Printre colinele verzi (1971)
Michael the Brave (1971)
Puterea și adevărul (1972)
Bariera (1972)
Lupul Mărilor (1972)
Şapte zile (1973)
Capcana (1974)
Dincolo de nisipuri (1974)
Tatăl risipitor (1974)
Trei scrisori secrete (1974)
The Actor and the Savages (1975)
Cursa (1975)
Nu filmăm să ne amuzăm (1975)
Zile fierbinți (1975)
Dincolo de pod (1976)
Ultima noapte a singurătății (1976)
Tufă de Veneția (1977)
Acţiunea Autobuzul (1978)
Ediţie specială (1978)
Mânia (1978)
Pentru patrie (1978)
Revanşa (1978)
Drumuri în cumpănă (1979)
Uncle Marin, the Billionaire (1979)
Mihail, câine de circ (1979)
Braţele Afroditei (1979)
Un om în loden (1979)
Vacanță tragică (1979)
Cumpăna (1980)
Ancheta (1980)
The Actress, the Dollars and the Transylvanians (1980)
Capcana mercenarilor (1981)
Înghițitorul de săbii (1982)
Orgolii (1980)
Semnul șarpelui (1980)
La capătul liniei (1983)
Dragostea și revoluţia (1983)
Amurgul fântânilor (1984)
Horea (1984)
Ziua Z (1985)
The Last Assault (1986)
Punct și de la capăt (1987)
Trenul de aur (1987)
Cuibul de viespi (1987)
Anotimpul iubirii (1987)
Cale liberă (1987)
Totul se plătește (1987)
Flăcări pe comori (1988)
Dreptatea (1989)
Portret anonim – autor necunoscut (1989) (unreleased)
Călătorie de neuitat (1989)
Misiunea (1989)
Serenadă pe Dunăre (1989)
Wilhelm Cuceritorul (1989)
Rămânerea (1990)
Fără drept de corespondență (1990)
The Earth's Most Beloved Son (1993)
Ultimul mesager (1994)
Le travail de furet (1994)
Le passage (1994
Craii de Curtea-veche (1995)
Ochii care nu se văd... (1995)
Scrisorile prietenului (1995)
Semne în pustiu (1996)
Regina (2008)
Fetele Marinarului (2009)
Aniversarea (2017)

References

External links

 Mircea Albulescu's page at National Theatre Bucharest

1934 births
2016 deaths
Male actors from Bucharest
Romanian male film actors
Caragiale National University of Theatre and Film alumni